Tenuibacillus multivorans is a Gram-positive, rod-shaped, moderately halophilic and spore-forming bacterium from the genus of Tenuibacillus which has been isolated from soil from a neutral salt lake in Xinjiang.

References

Bacillaceae
Bacteria described in 2005